Friends: Conditions Apply is an Indian TV series that first aired on Channel V India on 8 December 2014. The show is produced by actor turned producer Kabir Sadanand under his banner Frog Unlimited.

The Lalit Sen show went on a seasonal break, but later it was reported that the plans of its comeback are on hold. Written by Siddhartha vankar

Overview
Friends: Conditions Apply revolves around Shakti Rai who witnesses her parents' murder at a very young age. The only person left standing by her is Rajneil Purohit, her guardian. Shakti is suffering from an anxiety disorder for which she takes medications. She has a childhood friend named Murli whom she regards as her elder brother.

Years later, Shakti finds her guardian chained in a prison cell. Shakti believes he is innocent and vows to get him released. Shakti and Murli devise a plan to get some high-profile rich kids kidnapped and then pressurize the government to have Rajneil released in exchange for the kids. Shakti plans to have her own friends involved in this. Shakti's plan eventually works but she finds herself in an unexpected turn of events.

Cast
Shivani Tomar as Shakti Rai
Adnan Khan as Omar
Nitin Chauhaan as Murli
Dhiraj Totlani as Binoy
Pooja Singh as Isha
Sagar Shetty as Chirag
Neha Tomar as Juhi
Gulshan Nain as Imple
Amit Behl as Rajneil Purohit
 Sangam Rai as Balli
Deepali Muchrikar as Tara
Hargun Grover as Agni
Prashant Ranyal as Major Vikram

Production
The show was originally titled Ek Dinn.

The trailer for the series made a record with 8 lakhs hits in a single day on YouTube.

External links
 Friends: Conditions Apply on Hotstar

References

Channel V India original programming
2014 Indian television series debuts
Indian teen drama television series
2015 Indian television series endings